Joe Hernandez (February 9, 1940 – December 7, 2021) was an American football wide receiver who  played in the National Football League for the Washington Redskins and the Canadian Football League (CFL) for the Edmonton Eskimos.

College years
He played college football for the University of Arizona.

Professional career
Hernandez was drafted in the second round of the 1962 NFL Draft. He was also selected in the fifth round of the 1962 AFL Draft by the Oakland Raiders.

Upon his return to the Edmonton Eskimos, he switched to playing defensive back and was a two time all-star (1967 and 1970.)

Personal life and death
Hernandez was of Mexican descent. He died from COVID-19 on December 7, 2021, at the age of 81.

References

1940 births
2021 deaths
American football wide receivers
American sportspeople of Mexican descent
New Mexico Military Institute Broncos football players
Arizona Wildcats football players
Edmonton Elks players
Washington Redskins players
Players of American football from Bakersfield, California
Deaths from the COVID-19 pandemic in California